A Christmas Carol is a 1984 British-American made-for-television film adaptation of Charles Dickens' famous 1843 novella of the same name. The film was directed by Clive Donner, who had been an editor of the 1951 film Scrooge, and stars George C. Scott as Ebenezer Scrooge. It was filmed in the historic medieval county town of Shrewsbury in Shropshire.

Plot

It is Christmas Eve in 19th Century London. Ebenezer Scrooge, a cynical commodities trader, does not share the Holiday merriment. He declines his nephew Fred Hollywell's invitation for Christmas dinner, and reluctantly accepts his loyal-but-underpaid employee Bob Cratchit's request to have Christmas off...since there will be no business during the day. As he leaves for the exchange, Scrooge encounters young Tim - Bob's crippled son - waiting across from his office. After mistaking Tim for a beggar, Scrooge declares that the boy will have a long and cold wait for his father. At the exchange, Scrooge charges three other businessmen 5% extra for corn (because they failed to meet his demands yesterday), much to their chagrin. Scrooge then declines giving a donation to charity workers Poole and Hacking.

Later that night at his home, Scrooge encounters the ghost of his late business partner Jacob Marley—who warns him to repent his miserly ways, lest he be condemned to the same afterlife as that of Marley's: carrying heavy chains forged from his own greed. Marley informs Scrooge that three spirits will visit him that night.

At 1 A.M., the Ghost of Christmas Past takes Scrooge back in time to his unhappy childhood and early adulthood. They examine Scrooge's tenure as a student, abandoned at boarding school by his grim father Silas...who wanted nothing to do with Ebenezer, since the boy's mother died giving birth to him. Silas got Ebenezer an apprenticeship with Fezziwig; the boy was missed by his loving elder sister, Fan, who died just a few years after welcoming Fred. Ebenezer's moneylending business thrived, but his preoccupation with financial security cost him his engagement to Belle...who later welcomed a large, happy family with another man. She feels Scrooge's loneliness, upon hearing that Marley is deathly ill. The flustered Scrooge suddenly finds himself back in his bedroom.

At 2 A.M., the Ghost of Christmas Present, shows Scrooge the joys and wonder of Christmas Day. They visit the Cratchit residence, and find Bob's family surprisingly content with their small dinner. Scrooge takes pity on Tim, whom the spirit explains will not survive another year. The ghost mocks Scrooge's change of heart, and quotes Ebenezer's earlier callous comments about the poor. Scrooge is taken to Fred's house for the Christmas party which Scrooge declined to attend. Fred continues to pursue a relationship with Scrooge for the sake of his late mother, Fan, with whom Scrooge shared great fondness; Ebenezer is touched by this. The spirit takes Scrooge to a desolate street where homeless families, desperate and eager for work, are camped...disproving Scrooge's belief about the poor being shiftless. The ghost shows Ebenezer two hideous children named Ignorance and Want, warning Scrooge to beware of them before he disappears.

The Ghost of Christmas Future brings Scrooge to the exchange, where three businessmen discuss the death of an unnamed colleague...whose funeral they would attend only if lunch is provided. Ebenezer finds several of his stolen possessions being traded to a fence named Joe. Scrooge is transported to the Cratchit house; Bob and his family, reeling from Tim's death, vow to keep the boy with them in all they say and do. The dully-affected Ebenezer is taken to his own grave at a neglected cemetery; he vows to change his ways for the better, and begs to be spared. He finds himself back in his bedroom.

Discovering that it is Christmas morning, Scrooge anonymously sends the Cratchits a large prize-winning turkey for dinner. Proceeding to spread happiness among the citizens of London, he makes a large donation to the elated Poole and Hacking. Scrooge visits the Hollywell residence; Fred and his wife Janet are delighted when Ebenezer welcomes his nephew's invitation to Christmas dinner. The following day, Scrooge names Cratchit his new partner...and becomes a second father to Tim, whose ailments are treated successfully. Scrooge goes on to shower everyone around him with kindness, generosity, and compassion; having rediscovered his inner child, he embodies all three Spirits of Christmas.

Cast

 George C. Scott – Ebenezer Scrooge
 Mark Strickson – Young Ebenezer Scrooge
 Frank Finlay – Marley's Ghost
 Angela Pleasence – Spirit of Christmas Past
 Edward Woodward – Spirit of Christmas Present
 Michael Carter – Spirit of Christmas Future
 David Warner – Bob Cratchit
 Susannah York – Mrs. Cratchit
 Anthony Walters – Timothy "Tiny Tim" Cratchit
 Louise Gasser – Martha Cratchit, daughter
 Orlando Wells (Susannah York's real-life son) – Michael Cratchit
 Nancy Dodds – Nancy Cratchit
 Sasha Wells (Susannah York's real-life daughter) – Belinda Cratchit, daughter
 Kieron Hughes – Peter Cratchit, son
 Roger Rees – Fred Hollywell/Narrator
 Caroline Langrishe – Janet Hollywell, Fred's wife
 Lucy Gutteridge – Belle, Scrooge's fiancée
 Nigel Davenport – Silas Scrooge, Ebenezer and Fan's father
 Joanne Whalley – Fan Scrooge-Hollywell, Ebenezer's sister and Fred's mother
 Timothy Bateson – Mr. Fezziwig
 Michael Gough – Mr. Poole
 John Quarmby – Mr. Hacking
 Peter Woodthorpe – Joe the Fence
 Liz Smith – Mrs. Dilber
 John Sharp – Mr. Tipton
 Derek Francis – Mr. Pemberton
 Danny Davies – Forbush
 Brian Pettifer – Ben (homeless father)
 Catherine Hall – Meg (homeless mother)
 Cathryn Harrison – Kate

Production

This movie was filmed on location in Shrewsbury, Shropshire, in the English Midlands. It originally aired on the American television network CBS on 17 December 1984, and was released theatrically in Great Britain. The U.S. debut was sponsored by IBM, which purchased all of the commercial spots for the two-hour premiere. The film brought in a 20.7/30 rating/share, winning its time slot and ranking No. 10 for the week. The film was marketed with the tagline "A new powerful presentation of the most loved ghost story of all time!" Scott was nominated for an Emmy for Outstanding Lead Actor in a Limited Series or a Special for his portrayal of Scrooge.

The movie has run in syndication on local American channels since it debuted in 1984, and was released on VHS in 1989 (in the UK) and to DVD in 1999. This was because Scott himself (and later his estate through Baxter Healthcare, to whom the Scott family donated their copyright) owned the rights to this film. On 25 November 2007, it returned to national television on AMC for the first time since its debut, and the network continues to show it each December under license from the Scott estate and 20th Century Studios/Walt Disney Television (the latter's distribution rights the result of their owning the video rights). In 2009, the Hallmark Channel also ran the movie soon after Thanksgiving. It remains among the most beloved of the several adaptations of A Christmas Carol. The same year, the film was re-released on DVD by Fox, with updated box art but the same menu and features as the previous DVD release. Fox released it on Blu-ray in December 2010.

Critical response
Novelist and essayist Louis Bayard, writing for Salon.com, described this adaptation as "the definitive version of a beloved literary classic", praising its fidelity to Dickens' original story, the strength of the supporting cast, and especially Scott's performance as Scrooge.

See also
 List of Christmas films
 List of ghost films
 Adaptations of A Christmas Carol

References

External links
 
 
 

1984 films
1984 television films
Films based on A Christmas Carol
Television shows based on A Christmas Carol
American Christmas films
British television films
Christmas television films
Films directed by Clive Donner
Films set in the Victorian era
CBS network films
Ghosts in television
1980s Christmas films
1980s English-language films